Vladislav Yuryevich Pavlovich (also spelled Pavlovitch, born 17 March 1971) is a former Russian fencer, who won a gold Olympic medal in the team foil competition at the 1996 Summer Olympics in Atlanta.

References

External links 
 
 
 

1971 births
Living people
Russian male fencers
Fencers at the 1996 Summer Olympics
Olympic fencers of Russia
Olympic gold medalists for Russia
Martial artists from Moscow
Olympic medalists in fencing
Medalists at the 1996 Summer Olympics
20th-century Russian people